Baia Mare is a municipality along the Săsar River, in northwestern Romania; it is the capital of Maramureș County. The city lies in the region of Maramureș, a subregion of Transylvania.

Located south of Igniș and Gutâi Mountains, Baia Mare had a population of 123,738 at the 2011 census, and a metropolitan area home to 230,932 residents. The city administers four villages: Blidari (Kőbánya), Firiza (Felsőfernezely), Valea Borcutului (Borpatak) and Valea Neagră (Feketepatak). Baia Mare was named the Romanian Youth Capital from 2 May 2018 to 1 May 2019.

History

Prehistory 

The city's development on the middle course of Săsar River, in the middle of a plateau with a warm Mediterranean-like climate, has facilitated living conditions since the Palaeolithic.

Ancient times 

During the Bronze Age the region was inhabited by Thracian tribes. Later, it was included in the Dacian Kingdom formed by the King Burebista when the mining exploration began, as the area is rich in gold and silver.

Middle Ages 

Baia Mare is first mentioned in written documents released by Charles I of Hungary in 1328 under the name of Rivulus Dominarum. In 1347 the town was identified in documents by Louis I of Hungary as an important medieval town with a prosperous mining industry.  Its rules of organisation were characteristic of the "free towns" of that time.  In 1411 the town and its surrounding areas, including the mines, were transferred into the property of the Hunyadi family by Sigismund, King of Hungary (later also Holy Roman Emperor), who recognised Janos Hunyadi's contribution to stop the Turkish invasion of Europe.

The town went into a period of prosperity, during which the St. Stephen Cathedral was built. Today the cathedral tower is one of the best-known of the town's historic landmarks (see Stephen's Tower).  The first school, named Schola Rivulina, was opened in Baia Mare in 1547 by the Reformed Church following the Protestant Reformation.

Modern period 

In 1703 Pintea Viteazul and his band managed to free the town for a short period of time from the German Imperial rule, under which it belonged the royal treasury. Since then Pintea is considered an important figure in the town's history, representing the idea of freedom. The Budești Church has Pintea's chain mail shirt and a helmet, reportedly worn by him in his battles.  The Museum of Baia Mare displays his weapons and their harness.

In 1748 the city's mining industry made a leap forward when the Austrian authorities created the headquarters of "Superior Mining".

In the late nineteenth century, Simon Hollósy, István Réti, János Thorma, Béla Iványi-Grünwald, and Károly Ferenczy were among numerous young Hungarians who left the area to study the arts in Munich, as Hungary lacked an academy of art in those times. Simon Hollósy, the young Hungarian painter, was teaching in his studio new western European techniques.

Some of those young painters decided to settle down together in Baia Mare, then called Nagybánya, to work on art. They persuaded Hollósy to join them and founded the Nagybánya artists' colony, working on naturalism and plein air painting. The artists' colony became known later on for influencing the development of twentieth-century Hungarian and Romanian art. Works by each of these important painters is held by the Hungarian National Gallery in Budapest, which in 2009 opened the exhibit, Munich in Hungarian, Hungarian Artists in Munich 1850-1914, 2 Oct 2009 - Jan 2010. In addition, in 1966 the museum held a major exhibition of their work: The Art of Nagybánya. Centennial Exhibition in Celebration of the Artists' Colony in Nagybánya.

Following World War I, the Austro-Hungarian Empire was dissolved, and in 1920, Baia Mare officially became part of the Kingdom of Romania. It became part of Hungary again between since 1940 by the Second Vienna Award, until the end of World War II. Near the end of that period, the city hosted the Baia Mare ghetto. After the war, the city was returned to Romania. Shortly after World War II in postwar development, the town of Baia Mare started to grow both in population and inhabited area. In the late 1970s and early 1980s, a new town centre was developed with modern architecture buildings and structures.

On 30 January 2000, Baia Mare was the site of what has been considered Europe's worst ecological disaster since Chernobyl, which took place at gold mining company Aurul, a joint-venture of the Australian company Esmeralda Exploration and the Romanian government. The tailing dam at the gold processing plant broke and  70 tons of toxic cyanide and heavy metal-laced waste water escaped into the River Tisza and into Hungary, making its way into the Danube and affecting Romania, Hungary, Ukraine, Serbia, and Bulgaria. More than 1,400 tons of fish, numerous eagles, storks and otters died. Scientists fear the release may have led to the ultimate extinction of at least five fish species. Despite the accident's happening in Romania, much of the adverse effects were suffered in Hungary. The accident prompted Hungary to ban the use of cyanide in gold processing and it has urged the rest of Europe to do the same.

Since 2013, local romani businessman Daniel Boldor has been operating out of the CUPROM mine and refinery outside of Baia Mare, selling what he claims are under-extracted Ore concentrate shipments to international metal traders in China, South Korea, Thailand, and the United States. Based on claims that the material was, in fact, worthless mining sludge, the public prosecutor's office in Constanța filed an indictment against Boldor in June 2018 on charges of money laundering, customs fraud, document forgery, the collection and transport of hazardous waste, and tax evasion.

Coat of arms
The coat of arms of Baia Mare was granted to the city by the Government in the late 1990s, early 2000s, some years after the communist symbols established in 1968 where de facto out of use starting 1989.

The shield is party per pale. In dexter, gules a miner in a mine argent, in sinister, azure a church tower or. The shield is topped by a mural crown with seven towers.

The miner refers to the main local economical activity. The church tower refers to the local cultural/ecclesiastical tradition. The crest shows the city's status as a county seat.

Geography

The city is situated in the vicinity of the Gutâi and Igniș Mountains. Altitudes reach 1400 meters in some peaks. The area is famous for its outstanding landscapes, and the mountains are easily accessible from the city, famous routes being: Igniș (1307 m), Mogoșa (1246 m), Gutâi (1443 m), Creasta Cocoșului (1450 m), Piatra Soimului (839 m), Plestioara (803 m), Dealul Bulat (683 m), Murgau (633 m), Dealul Crucii (500 m) etc.

The city is situated in the Baia Mare valley and is encircled on all sides by hills and mountains, which makes the climate in the city milder than the rest of the surrounding area. Proof of this is that the outskirts of Baia Mare are the only areas where you can find chestnut trees that usually need Mediterranean climate to grow. This is the northernmost reach of the chestnut tree.
However, abrupt temperature changes take place and, during the winters, the temperatures may occasionally drop below -20 degrees Celsius.

The summers are mild, cooler than in the rest of the country. The precipitations in this area are quite high, due to the mountains in the north and east which do not allow the air masses to pass beyond the region's limits, the average rainfall being almost 1000 mm/year. The city of Baia Mare is the most populous of northern Romanian cities (Satu Mare, Suceava, and Botoșani), with a population of approximately 124,000. It also has a high level of culture and education, being home to theatres, schools, museums and art galleries.

Not far from the city there are a few very important natural reservations, among them Creasta Cocoșului, Cheile Tătărului, Lacul Albastru etc. Because of its privileged location in the Eastern Carpathian mountains it is considered one of the most picturesque cities in Romania.

Demographics 

As of 2011 census data, Baia Mare has a population of 123,738, a decrease from the figure recorded at the 2002 census.

The ethnic composition of the city is as follows:
 Romanian: (84.11%)
 Hungarian: (12.25%)
 Roma: (2.76%)
 Germans (i.e. Zipser Germans): (0.24%)
 Ukrainian: (0.16%)
 Jews: (0.02%)

and 642 others, including Greeks, Turks, Italians, Lipovans, Poles, and Slovaks.

Baia Mare metropolitan area has a population of 215,932, an area of 1,395.38 square kilometres (538.76 sq mi), and includes the municipality of Baia Mare, five towns (Baia Sprie, Cavnic, Seini, Șomcuta Mare, and Tăuții-Măgherăuș), and 13 communes (Cernești, Cicârlău, Coaș, Coltău, Copalnic-Mănăștur, Dumbrăvița, Groși, Mireșu Mare, Recea, Remetea Chioarului, Satulung, Săcălășeni, and Valea Chioarului).

Historical population 

In 1912, out of the total population of 12,877 people, 9,992 were Hungarians (including Jews), 2,677 Romanians, and 175 Germans (i.e. Zipser Germans).

In 1920, of the 12,780 inhabitants, 5,005 were Romanians, 4,652 Hungarians, 1,792 Jews, 1,232 Germans, and 99 of other ethnicities. Many inhabitants declared themselves as Hungarian-speakers during previous censuses, despite not being ethnic Hungarians

Before the Second World War, Baia Mare had a community of more than 1,000 Jews. In 1944, most of the Jews were deported by the Hungarian occupation authorities to Nazi concentration and extermination camps. Most of the few survivors emigrated from the area. , 32 Jews lived in the city. Along with Rădăuți, Gura Humorului and others, Baia Mare had a Jewish shtetl, or settlement. The synagogue dates from 1885.

Politics 

The Baia Mare Municipal Council, elected at the 2012 local elections, had the following political composition:

The Baia Mare Municipal Council, elected at the 2016 local elections, had the following political composition:

The Baia Mare Municipal Council, renewed at the 2020 local elections, consists of 23 counsellors and has the following political composition:

Economy

The economic activity of Baia Mare has been based on the mining activities located in the surrounding areas. However, after the 1989 Revolution and industrial changes, such mining declined considerably.  They have been replaced with several activities which have improved the city's economy in recent years.  Baia Mare has become one of the most economically evolved cities in the region. As a result, several supermarkets have been built in the city as well as one of the biggest shopping malls in over  radius. The largest sofa manufacturing plant in Eastern Europe, Italsofa, is located near the Baia Mare city highway ring.

The city has a mainline (and branch) passenger and freight railway service provided by CFR, the national railway carrier.

Culture 
In Baia Mare there is one library (with a few branches), 6 museums, one planetarium and observatory, 2 theaters, 2 cultural centers, one art school and one popular university.
 "Petre Dulfu" County Library
 County Museum of History and Archeology Baia Mare
 Museum of Mineralogy Baia Mare
 Planetarium and astronomical observatory Baia Mare
 Arts center Baia Mare- Art Museum
 Ethnography and folk art Museum Baia Mare
 Municipal Theater Baia Mare
 Puppet Theater Baia Mare

Natives

Sportsmen 

 Eugen Apjok
 Camelia Balint-Hotea
 Alin Bota
 Daniel Brata 
 Cristian Bud
 Romulus Buia
 Claudiu Bumba
 Rodica Dunca
 Melinda Geiger
 Vasile Gergely
 Ioan Gherghel

 Ovidiu Hoban
 Ákos Koller
 Noemi Lung
 Teodora Măgurean
 Darius Makaria
 Vasile Miriuță
 Bogdan Pereș
 Daniel Sabou
 Alexandru Terheș
 Raluca Udroiu
 Ciprian Vasilache

Singers and composers
 Dora Cojocaru - composer and musicologist
 Gheorghe Costin - conductor and composer
 Adrian Sina- singer and composer
 Paula Seling - singer and composer
 AMI (Romanian singer) - singer and composer

Painters
 Adrian Ghenie
 István Réti

Others
 Csaba Ferenc Asztalos - politician
 Mihai Morar - entertainment journalist
 Lucian Mureșan - Cardinal, Major Archbishop of Făgăraș-Alba Iulia
 László Németh - writer

Residents

Writers, poets 
 Ion Burnar - poet
 Augustin Buzura - Romanian novelist
 Mária Földes - Romanian born Jewish-Hungarian playwright
 Ioan Groșan - Romanian novelist
 Florin Tătaru - Romanian politician
 Igor Ursenco - Romanian fiction writer, poet, and culturologist

Education 
In Baia Mare there are 23 schools, 34 kindergartens and 18 highschools. Higher education is represented by:
 Northern University 
 Bogdan Vodă University from Baia Mare
 "Vatra" University of Arts from Baia Mare
 "Vasile Goldiș" Western University Baia Mare
National highschools from Baia Mare:
 Gheorghe Șincai National College
 Emil Racoviță Theoretical Highschool
 Vasile Lucaciu National College
 Mihai Eminescu National College
 Arts College 
 "Nicolae Titulescu" Economics College
 Highschool of Sports
 "George Barițiu" Technical College
 "Anghel Saligny" Technical College
 "C.D. Nenițescu" Technical College
 "Németh László" Theoretical Highschool

Twin towns – sister cities

Baia Mare is twinned with:

 Bielsko-Biała, Poland (2001)
 Combs-la-Ville, France (2009)
 Hódmezővásárhely, Hungary (2001)
 Hollywood, United States (2001)
 Kitwe, Zambia (1972)
 Nyíregyháza, Hungary (2001)
 Serino, Italy (2003)
 Szolnok, Hungary (1990)
 Wels, Austria (2000)

Structures
 Chimney of Phoenix Copper Smelter, height: 351.5 metres, which is the tallest structure in Romania.

References

External links

 Official website
 University of Baia Mare 
 Photos of the city and its surroundings in the dedicated Flickr group
 

 
Cities in Romania
Capitals of Romanian counties
Populated places in Maramureș County
Mining communities in Romania
1142 establishments in Europe
 
12th-century establishments in Romania